Qianfeng Road is a station on Line 3 and Line 6 of the Chengdu Metro in China.

Station layout

Gallery

References

Railway stations in Sichuan
Railway stations in China opened in 2016
Chengdu Metro stations